The following is a list of events relating to television in Ireland from 1996.

Events

18 May – Ireland wins the Eurovision Song Contest with The Voice, a song composed by Brendan Graham and performed by Eimear Quinn.
24 May – The RTÉ website, www.rte.ie, is launched.
24 May – RTÉ 1 premieres the BBC television drama Ballykissangel. Not only was the series British, but it was also Irish as it was set in the Republic of Ireland and filmed in Avoca and Enniskerry in County Wicklow as well as being produced-in house by BBC Northern Ireland.
12 September – For the first time ever, long running UK children's television series Thomas the Tank Engine & Friends begins airing in Ireland on Network 2.
21 September – The popular animated series Hey Arnold!, made for Nickelodeon,  begins its very first premiere on Irish television on Network 2 as part of the Saturday morning children's block The Swamp.The broadcast took place a month before its broadcasting debut in its homeland. Network 2 will start off with only three episodes of the series before returning on 8 April 1997 with more episodes to come.
27 September – Bosco is broadcast for the final time.
30 September – The Morbegs, a television programme for preschoolers and the replacement programme for Bosco, premieres on Network 2 for the first time. It would become one of the most popular children's programmes on Irish television. Despite the show's ending in 1998, it continues to air until 2008.
31 October – The Irish language television service Teilifís na Gaeilge (TG4) goes on air for the first time.
24 December – Britt Allcroft's well known musical animated series for children Magic Adventures of Mumfie is transmitted for the first time on television in Ireland on Teilifís na Gaeilge. The series was dubbed into Irish, although viewers who could receive UTV or HTV Wales can view it with its original English dub.

Debuts

RTÉ 1
4 March –  The Elephant Show (1984–1988)
24 May –  Ballykissangel (1996–2001)
15 June – Good Grief Moncrieff! (1996)
8 September – Brendan O'Carroll's Hot Milk and Pepper (1996–1998)
Undated – Fame and Fortune (1996–2006)

Network 2
6 January –  The Little Mermaid (1992–1994)
6 January –  Happy Ness: The Secret of the Loch (1995)
10 January –  Almost Perfect (1995–1996)
11 January –  The Tick (1994–1996)
13 January –  The Sylvester & Tweety Mysteries (1995–2002)
16 January –  Legend of the Hidden City (1996–1998)
21 February –  Spellbinder (1995)
22 February –  Action Man (1995–1996)
28 March –  The Story Store (1996)
30 March –  Street Sharks (1994–1997)
1 April –  Little Bear (1995–2003)
6 April –  The Silver Brumby (1996–1998)
6 April –  The Secret World of Alex Mack (1994–1998)
8 April –  Yogi the Easter Bear (1994)
11 April –  Bonkers (1993–1994)
11 April –  Mort and Phil (1994)
16 April –  Pinky and the Brain (1995–1998)
18 April –  Caroline in the City (1995–1999)
28 April –  The Magical Adventures of Quasimodo (1996)
5 May –  Detective Bogey (1994)
1 July – The Swamp Summer Salad (1996)
31 August –  Oscar's Orchestra (1995–2000)
8 September –  Bugs (1995–1999)
9 September –  Wolves, Witches and Giants (1995–1999)
9 September –  Hypernauts (1996)
9 September –  The Fantastic Voyages of Sinbad the Sailor (1996–1998)
10 September –  Bump in the Night (1994–1995)
12 September –  Earthworm Jim (1995–1996)
12 September –  Thomas the Tank Engine & Friends (1984–2021)
12 September –  Wishbone (1995–1997)
13 September –  The Babaloos (1995–1998)
13 September –  The Genie from Down Under (1996–1998)
18 September –  The Real Adventures of Jonny Quest (1996–1997)
21 September –  Hey Arnold! (1996–2004)
21 September –  Dennis and Gnasher (1996–1998)
27 September –  The Magic Library (1988)
28 September – Return of the Swamp Thing (1996–1997)
30 September – The Morbegs (1996–2008)
1 October –  Littlest Pet Shop (1995)
1 October –  Monty the Dog who wears glasses (1995)
27 October –  Sliders (1995–1999)
9 December –  Madeline (1993–2001)
13 December –  Samson Superslug (1994–1996)
24 December –  Brambly Hedge (1996–2000)
25 December –  Shining Time Station: 'Tis a Gift (1990)
25 December –  The BFG (1989)
25 December –  A Close Shave (1995)
25 December –  Dot and Spot's Magical Christmas Adventure (1996)
27 December –  The Willows in Winter (1996)
27 December –  Nilus the Sandman (1996–1998)
27 December –  The Demon Headmaster (1996–1998)
Undated –  Animated Hero Classics (1991–2004)
Undated - Central Park West (1995-1996)
Undated - Space: Above and Beyond (1995-1996)

Teilifís na Gaeilge
31 October – Nuacht (1996–present)
31 October – C.U. Burn (1996)
1 November – Cúlabúla (1996–1999)
3 November – Ros na Rún (1996–present)
7 November –  Delfy and His Friends (1992)
24 December –  Magic Adventures of Mumfie (1994)
Undated – Geantraí (1996–present)

BBC 1
12 February – BBC Newsline (1996–present)

Changes of network affiliation

Ongoing television programmes

1960s
RTÉ News: Nine O'Clock (1961–present)
RTÉ News: Six One (1962–present)
The Late Late Show (1962–present)

1970s
Sports Stadium (1973–1997)
The Late Late Toy Show (1975–present)
RTÉ News on Two (1978–2014)
The Sunday Game (1979–present)

1980s
Glenroe (1983–2001)
Live at 3 (1986–1997)
Saturday Live (1986–1999)
Questions and Answers (1986–2009)
Dempsey's Den (1986–2010)
Know Your Sport (1987–1998)
Kenny Live (1988–1999)
Fair City (1989–present)
RTÉ News: One O'Clock (1989–present)

1990s
Would You Believe (1990s–present)
Winning Streak (1990–present)
Blackboard Jungle (1991–1997)
Challenging Times (1991–2001)
Prime Time (1992–present)
The Movie Show (1993–2001)
No Disco (1993–2003)
Echo Island (1994–1999)
Upwardly Mobile (1995–1997)
Nuacht RTÉ (1995–present)

Ending this year
3 April – Marketplace (1987–1996)
7 April – Where in the World? (1987–1996)
24 August – Good Grief Moncrieff! (1996)
30 August – The Swamp Summer Salad (1996)
Undated – Mailbag (1982–1996)

See also
1996 in Ireland

References

 
1990s in Irish television